The imperial election of 1411 was an imperial election held to select the emperor of the Holy Roman Empire.  It took place on July 21.

Background 
On September 20, 1378, the cardinals elected Antipope Clement VII pope in opposition to Pope Urban VI, whom they had come to distrust.  The existence of two popes in opposition to one another, called the Western Schism, led to escalating international crises as the kings of Europe were forced to choose sides.  By 1411, three individuals claimed to be pope: Pope Gregory XII, Antipope Benedict XIII and Antipope John XXIII.

The Holy Roman Emperor Rupert, King of Germany died on May 18, 1410.  Three of the prince-electors of the Holy Roman Empire convened at the imperial election of September 20, 1410 to elect Sigismund, Holy Roman Emperor, king of Hungary and son of a previous emperor, Charles IV, Holy Roman Emperor, his successor.  These included Frederick I, Elector of Brandenburg, burgrave of Nuremberg, who claimed to act on behalf of Jobst of Moravia, elector of Brandenburg and Rupert's nephew, without his knowledge or consent.  The remaining electors did not accept Sigismund, and convened at the imperial election of October 1, 1410 to elect Jobst as Rupert's successor.

Jobst died, possibly by poisoning, on January 18, 1411.  The seven prince-electors called to select a Holy Roman Emperor in 1411 were:

 Johann II von Nassau, elector of Mainz
 Werner of Falkenstein, elector of Trier
 Frederick III of Saarwerden, elector of Cologne
 Wenceslaus IV of Bohemia, king of Bohemia
 Louis III, Elector Palatine, elector of the Electoral Palatinate
 Rudolf III, Duke of Saxe-Wittenberg, elector of Saxony
 Sigismund, as elector of Brandenburg

Elected 
Sigismund was unanimously elected.  He accepted his election, tacitly admitting to the invalidity of his election in September of the previous year.

Aftermath 
Sigismund was crowned King of the Romans at Aachen on November 8, 1414, and Holy Roman Emperor in Rome on May 31, 1433.

On December 24, 1414, he arrived at the Council of Constance, a council which he had urged to end the Western Schism.  The council would accept Gregory's resignation on July 4, 1415 and excommunicate John and Benedict in 1417.  Pope Martin V was elected pope on November 11.

In exchange for his support in the imperial election of September 1410, Sigismund appointed Frederick I elector of Brandenburg at the Council of Constance on April 30, 1415.  Frederick I was the first member of the House of Hohenzollern, which would produce the three German emperors in the 19th and 20th centuries, to hold that title.

1411
1411 in the Holy Roman Empire
15th-century elections
Non-partisan elections
Sigismund, Holy Roman Emperor